Margaret Patricia Hornsby-Smith, Baroness Hornsby-Smith,  (17 March 1914 – 3 July 1985) was a Conservative Party politician in the United Kingdom.

Early life and education
Margaret Patricia Hornsby-Smith was born 17 March 1914 in East Sheen, the second child and only daughter of shopkeeper Frederick Charles Hornsby-Smith, a saddle dealer and master umbrella maker, and his wife, Ellen (née Minter). She was educated at the local elementary school, and at Richmond County School for Girls. After leaving school she worked as a private secretary for several firms and for an employers' federation. Her interest in politics was established early and she joined the Junior Imperial League at the age of sixteen. The following year she was invited to join the Conservative Party's supporting team of speakers for the 1931 election campaign.

During the war she undertook voluntary work. In 1941 she took a job in the civil service as Principal Private Secretary to Lord Selborne, the minister of economic warfare, a post she held until the end of the war.

Political career
Her political career took off after the war. She was elected for a term on Barnes council where she served from 1945 – 1949.
At the 1950 general election, she was elected as Member of Parliament for Chislehurst, winning a majority of only 167 votes over the sitting Labour MP, George Wallace.

She was re-elected at the next four general elections (1951, 1955, 1959, 1964), served as Parliamentary Secretary 1951 – 1957 and was made a Privy Counsellor in 1959.

In 1964 she presented the Nurses Act to Parliament. She was appointed a Dame Commander of the Order of the British Empire (DBE) in September 1961.

At the 1966 election, she lost her seat to Labour's Alistair Macdonald, by a majority of only 810. Four years later, at the 1970 election, she regained the seat with a majority of 3363.

Constituency boundary changes implemented in the February 1974 general election encouraged Hornsby-Smith to allow Roger Sims to stand for Chislehurst, and to compete instead for the new constituency of Sidcup. However, Edward Heath also selected to run for Sidcup so Hornsby-Smith stood in another new seat; Aldridge-Brownhills. She lost to the Labour candidate Geoff Edge by just 366 votes.

Hornsby-Smith was subsequently elevated to a life peerage on 13 May 1974 as Baroness Hornsby-Smith, of Chislehurst in the County of Kent.

Death and memorial
Patricia Hornsby-Smith died on 3 July 1985 in Westminster. Her funeral was held at Mortlake five days later.  A memorial service was held on 29 October 1985 at St Margaret's, Westminster. Prime Minister Margaret Thatcher read one of the lessons.

Other activities
Lady Hornsby Smith was portrayed in the 2008 drama The Long Walk to Finchley (by actress Sylvestra Le Touzel).

References

External links
 Patricia Hornsby-Smith pictures at the National Portrait Gallery, London
 

1914 births
1985 deaths
Conservative Party (UK) MPs for English constituencies
Female members of the Parliament of the United Kingdom for English constituencies
Conservative Party (UK) life peers
Life peeresses created by Elizabeth II
Members of the Privy Council of the United Kingdom
Dames Commander of the Order of the British Empire
People from Chislehurst
People from East Sheen
Politicians from London
UK MPs 1950–1951
UK MPs 1951–1955
UK MPs 1955–1959
UK MPs 1959–1964
UK MPs 1964–1966
UK MPs 1970–1974
UK MPs who were granted peerages
20th-century British women politicians
Ministers in the third Churchill government, 1951–1955
Ministers in the Eden government, 1955–1957
Ministers in the Macmillan and Douglas-Home governments, 1957–1964
20th-century English women
20th-century English people